Charles Reynolds (c. 1496July 1535) was an Irish Catholic cleric, canonist, and diocesan administrator. Born in County Leitrim, son of Marcus MacRaghnaill, Reynolds entered a religious order and was appointed to influential posts as archdeacon and chaplain to the Earl of Kildare. He was educated at the University of Oxford and fluent in English, Irish, and Latin. Reynolds opposed Henry VIII of England's separation from the Catholic Church, declining to acknowledge him as Supreme Head of the Church of England and refusing to acknowledge the annulment of his marriage to Catherine of Aragon.

During the Kildare Rebellion of 1534–5 against King Henry, Reynolds was dispatched as envoy to Rome to seek support from the Pope. In May 1535 he secured a papal promise to excommunicate King Henry of England.

Reynolds died of an "incurable fever" and was buried in Archbasilica of St. John Lateran on 15 July 1535. The inscription on his grave slab in Rome gives accurate dates for his birth in Ireland, death in Rome, provides a family setting, and reveals the pope intended to consecrate him bishop.

Reynolds was posthumously attainted of high treason in 1536.

Life

Early life (1496–1531) 
 Charles Reynolds was born in 1496 or 1497 at Mohill in County Leitrim, then the religious centre of Muintir Eolais. His father was Maurus Mac Raghnaill, canon in the Church of Ardagh. Whether he had brothers or sisters is not recorded. His father or mother taught him Latin before enrolling him in school for children of nobility. By age fifteen he was a novice at the Augustinian Priory of Saint Mary in Mohill-Manachan, a monastery of the Canons regular of St. Augustine. The Canons Regular of Saint Augustine were one of several institutions born from an eleventh-century religious reform movement. The ecclesiastical branch of the Mac Raghnaill family had very strong associations with the Augustinian priory of Mohill, Co. Leitrim, from at least the fifteenth century.

Nothing is known of his early life and ministries. Charles must have been highly regarded because sometime after completing his novitiate in Mohill, he was transferred, or moved, to the more important Diocese of Meath. In 1528 he was studying Canon law at the University of Oxford, a rare privilege for a native Irishman. Because the Mac Raghnaill were allied to the Kildare camp the church may have given them preferential treatment. Reynolds graduated in Canon Law around 1531, and secured a grant of "English liberty" entitling him to acquire property and benefice in English Ireland.

Archdeacon of Kells (1532–1534) 

On returning to Ireland, Reynolds became chaplain to Gerald FitzGerald, 9th Earl of Kildare, lord deputy of Ireland. The Fitzgerald dynasty was the most powerful family in Ireland. Reynolds was also appointed archdeacon of Kells and rector of Nobber on 13 Feb 1532. A canonist, he was very active as a diocesan and provincial administrator. His appointments came during a time of tremendous international change, and a dangerous time for Christendom. Reynolds soon became involved in huge political issues.

Revolt against Henry VIII (1534–1535)
During 1533, the political situation in Ireland and England was fraught with tension over Henry Tudor's English Reformation. The Irish Council in the Pale was dominated by rival Norman-Irish factions, and the only clerics trusted to promote the English Reformation in Ireland were three Englishmen, the most prominent being John Alen, Archbishop of Dublin. Rumours circulated that Charles V, Holy Roman Emperor, aggrieved by the treatment of his aunt, Catherine of Aragon, might intervene in Ireland. Thomas Cromwell, Henry's chief minister, decided to appoint an Englishman, William Skeffington as lord deputy in Ireland. The incumbent, Gerald Fitzgerald, was imprisoned in the Tower of London in spring 1534, provoking his son "Silken" Thomas to start the "Kildare rebellion". Charles V responded quickly to appeals for assistance by dispatching emissaries. The potential for a military intervention drew international attention on Ireland.

Reynolds was a prominent member of a group of senior Irish clerics denouncing Henry as a heretic. These clerics shared a  held belief English rule was empowered, under Laudabiliter-inspired papal sanction, to merely reform the Irish along conventional canonical lines only. Recognising the English revolution as fundamentally attacking the intellectual and legal basis for their canonical beliefs, they were spurred into revolt and radical action. They believed the King of England had rejected the papal authority and tradition upon which his sovereign rule in Ireland rested, therefore his authority had to be denied. Prospects for a successful rebellion receded, when a fleeing Archbishop John Alen was captured and killed by rebels. The Pope responded by excommunicating Silken Thomas.

Reynolds was dispatched as an envoy abroad to pursue an alliance against Henry VIII of England, and seek his excommunication. He left Ireland by a boat from Sligo in December 1534. He first visited James V of Scotland, who was generally uncooperative with Henry VIII over Ireland. Reynolds was offered encouragement and was furnished with a letter from James V, complimenting him to cardinal Benedict of Ravenna, his agent. Reynolds travelled to Spain and met Charles V in either Madrid or Toledo. He received further encouragement and a promise of military assistance which ultimately never materialised. Reynolds finally travelled on to Italy and arrived there in May 1535, and presented his case personally to the Pope.

Papal meeting (1535)

Reynolds issued a stinging rebuke to pope Paul III for not condemning the heretical and schismatic behaviour of King Henry. He said he represented the Earl of Kildare, the other great nobles of Ireland, and their allies in England. He argued against Henry's ecclesiastical policy in general, rather than simply referring to the Irish political and ecclesiastical grievances. The pope, he said, was negligent for allowing so many souls to be lost by dallying over Henry's matrimonial question. If he had already passed the sentence of excommunication earned by Henry, the English would willingly arise in rebellion and secure its execution. In support of his presentation, Reynolds shared printed propaganda pamphlets published by the King, and a copy of Pope Innocent III's grant to John, King of England supporting the notion Ireland was a papal fiefdom subject to Rome's authority. Reynolds also requested absolution for his master, Silken Thomas, in failing to prevent Archbishop Alen from being murdered. He alleged Alen had promoted the heretical policy of the English crown and plotted murder upon the Earls of Kildare.

Pedro Ortiz, Charles V's ambassador in Rome, kept minutes of the papal meeting. According to Ortiz, Pope Paul III was impressed by his arguments, absolved the Earl, apologised for past negligence and dutifully promised to excommunicate King Henry VIII.

Death 
Reynolds never left Rome. He developed an "incurable fever", possibly malaria, and died in early July 1535, one day before the Pope was to appoint him Bishop of Elphin and Clonmacnoise. Reynolds was buried in the Archbasilica of St. John Lateran in Rome on the ides (15th) July 1535.

Legacy 
On 30 August 1535, Pope Paul III drew up a bull of excommunication which began "Eius qui immobilis". On 17 December 1538, Pope Paul III issued a further bull which began "Cum redemptor noster", renewing the execution of the bull of 30 August 1535, which had been suspended in a cautious hope Henry would repeal his behaviour.

Had Reynolds not died and returned to Ireland, he faced imprisonment and execution because the Attainder of the Earl of Kildare Act 1536 convicted him, Silken Thomas, and others, by name for high treason. Reynold's estate was confiscated for the King's use.

Grave slab in Rome 
Reynolds' grave-slab is in the cloister of the basilica of St John Lateran, where it is on display. It is damaged on all sides but retains an almost complete inscription that helps better understand what happened to him. The finely carved frame of all'antica style foliate decoration originally framed the entire stone. The top of the slab is lost, though the lower portion of the Fitzgerald crest can be observed, alongside the hind legs of a lion rampant associated with the arms of the Reynolds family.

Rev. Michael Walsh published the following inscription translation in 1961.

Another translation by Senan Furlong O.S.B. was published by Conleth Manning in 2010.

Both translations reveal he was buried on the ides of July (15 July) 1535, aged thirty-eight years. He died the day before he was to be ordained Bishop of Elphin and "Cluonensis" (Clonmacnoise or Clonfert). It praises his memory, whilst recording he was an Irishman, born of a noble family, and competent in civil and canon law. Charles belonged to the Mac Raghnaills, a Gaelic sept of Muintir Eolais, now forming part of southern county Leitrim. The inscription names his father as Maurus Mac Raghnaill, canon of the Augustinian Priory at Mohill. The Fergal 'Raynal' named in the last section is probably a relative of Charles.

See also 

 Eustace Chapuys
 John Fisher
 Monastery of Mohill-Manchan
 Thomas More

Notes and references

Notes

Citations

References

Further reading 

 
 
 

Year of birth uncertain
1535 deaths
Burials at the Archbasilica of Saint John Lateran
Alumni of the University of Oxford
Irish revolutionaries
People convicted of treason against England
People from Mohill
Archdeacons
Roman Catholic deacons
Deaths from malaria
1490s births
Archdeacons of Kells
History of County Leitrim
History of County Meath
People of Conmaicne Maigh Rein